The Zeppelin  is a group of speaker systems sold, designed, and manufactured by the English audio company Bowers & Wilkins for use with the iPod. The original speaker, the Zeppelin, was on sale from 2006-2011. WhatHiFi considered that it "set the benchmark for premium iPod speaker docks".

The device has now been updated, and renamed the Zeppelin Air. It received substantial  reviews by PC magazine, which rated it "excellent", and from What HiFi. The firm  also uses the Zeppelin brand to market the Zeppelin Mini, which was reviewed by PCmag, and What HiFi, in connection with their Zeppelin Air reviews. What HiFi said that "despite its smaller stature, there was no dip in sound quality."

Units compared

Input/Output

Audio

References 

Loudspeaker technology
Products introduced in 2006
iPod accessories
Bluetooth speakers